Georgios Kyriazis (Greek: Γεώργιος Κυριαζής; born 28 February 1980 in Thessaloniki) is a former Greek footballer. He is the Head Coach for Greece Women's National Football Team of the Hellenic Football Federation.

He was the member of Greek U21 team at 2002 UEFA European Under-21 Football Championship.

In late August 2005 he was signed by Serie B team Triestina in a reported 3-year contract. In July 2008 he left for Salernitana in a reported 2-year contract.

In 2013, Kyriazis retired after two seasons with the Rochester Rhinos (RNY FC). He has since served as the assistant coach for the Men's professional team and as the Junior Rhinos Technical Director.

Ιn August 2020 has been assigned as Greece Women's National Team Head Coach.

References

External links
 gazzetta.it

1980 births
Living people
Greek footballers
Greece under-21 international footballers
Footballers from Thessaloniki
Catania S.S.D. players
S.S. Arezzo players
Greek expatriate footballers
U.S. Triestina Calcio 1918 players
U.S. Salernitana 1919 players
Iraklis Thessaloniki F.C. players
Rochester New York FC players
Greek expatriate sportspeople in Italy
Expatriate footballers in Italy
Expatriate soccer players in the United States
Association football defenders
Super League Greece players
Serie B players
USL Championship players
Greek football managers
Greece women's national football team managers